Far Eastern State Technical University (FESTU) is a university located in Vladivostok, Russia.  It was established on February 20, 1930 as Far Eastern Politechnical Institute. It was granted the university status in 1992.

FESTU is not a successor of Oriental Institute as it claimed to be. The court denied its claims and reassured Far Eastern Federal University as the only successor. But FESTU was established on base of closed Oriental Institute and the building of the original Oriental Institute is currently the main building of Far Eastern State Technical University.

Partner universities 
  Ching Yun University, Taiwan

External links 
Far Eastern State Technical University website home page 
Far Eastern State Technical University website home page 

Universities in Vladivostok
Educational institutions established in 1930
1930 establishments in the Soviet Union